Umanata is a village and the municipal seat of Umanata Municipality, the fourth municipal section of the Eliodoro Camacho Province in the La Paz Department in Bolivia.

References 

Populated places in La Paz Department (Bolivia)